Landscape from Tsarigrad (Bulgarian: Пейзаж от Цариград) is a watercolor by Vladimir Dimitrov, from 1926.

Description
The water color on cardboard's dimensions are 69 x 99.2 centimeters. It is in the collection of the National Art Gallery, in Sofia.

Analysis
It depicts the skyline of Istanbul.

In 2010, it was a part of "The Faces of Modernism – Painting in Bulgaria, Greece and Romania, 1910-1940" exhibit.

References

National Art Gallery, Bulgaria
Watercolor paintings
1926 paintings